The 2007 Louis Vuitton Cup held in Valencia, Spain, from April 16 to June 6 was the event used to select the challenger for the 2007 America's Cup.  Eleven potential challengers competed in the competition which consisted of two round robins, two semi-finals and a final.  The winner was Emirates Team New Zealand, who challenged the defender Alinghi in June 2007 for the America's Cup.

Teams

Team New Zealand
Managed by Grant Dalton and skippered by Dean Barker, the crew included Terry Hutchinson; navigator Kevin Hall; strategist Ray Davies; Adam Beashel; Barry Mckay; Tony Rae; Don Cowie; Chris Ward ; Grant Loretz; Robert Salthouse; James Dagg; Rob Waddell; Andrew Hemmings; Jono McBeth; Matt Mason; Richard Meacham and Jeremy Lomas.

Ben Ainslie and Kelvin Harrap sailed the trial boat.

BMW Oracle Racing
Skippered by Chris Dickson, the crew included Gavin Brady, Phil Jameson, Paul Westlake, Scott Crawford, Alberto Barovier, Brad Webb, Brian MacInnes, Joe Spooner, Ross Halcrow, Robbie Naismith, Bertrand Pacé, Craig Monk, Carl Williams, Peter Isler and owner Larry Ellison.

Luna Rossa Challenge
Luna Rossa Challenge was led by Francesco de Angelis and helmsman James Spithill. The crew included Peter Gilmour, Francesco Bruni, mid-bowman Max Sirena, Emanuele Marino, Manuel Modena, Marco Montis, Benjamin Durham, Andy Horton, Michele Cannoni, Gilberto Nobili, Joey Newton, Shannon Falcone, Christian Kamp, Romolo Ranieri, Emanuele Marino, Andrew Taylor, Matteo Plazzi, Simone de Mari, Massimo Gherarducci, Paolo Bassani, Alan Smith, and Olympians Torben Grael, Philippe Presti, Michele Ivaldi, Magnus Augustson and Charles and Jonathan McKee.

Desafío Español 2007
Skippered by Luis Doreste, the boat was helmed by Karol Jabłoński and John Cutler was the teams tactician and technical director. The team was coached by Paul Cayard.

Victory Challenge
Magnus Holmberg skippered Victory Challenge. The afterguard included Stefan Rahn, Santiago Lange, Thierry Fouchier, and Morgan Larson. The crew also included six members of the former GBR Challenge; traveller/strategist Neal McDonald, Simon Fisher, David Carr, Nik Pearson, Richard Sydenham and Ian Weighell. Jeremy Scantlebury was the sailing team manager.

Mascalzone Latino
Vasco Vascotto was the skipper for Mascalzone Latino, which included helmsman Flavio Favini, Cameron Dunn, Jes Gram-Hansen, Andrea Pavan, Chris Dougall, Pierluigi De Felice, Giuseppe Brizzi, Davide Scarpa, Nacho Postigo, Giulio Giovanella and funder Vincenzo Onorato.

Team Shosholoza
South Africa's first challenge, Team Shosholoza was skippered by Mark Sadler and Ian Ainslie. The crew included Italians Paolo Cian and Tommaso Chieffi.

Areva Challenge
Managed by Dawn Riley, Areva Challenge was led by Thierry Peponnet and included Sebastien Col, Tanguy Cariou, Frederic Guilmin, Jean François Cuzon, Jim Turner, and Wade Morgan.

+39 Challenge
From Italy, +39 Challenge included non-sailing skipper Luca Devoti, helmsman Iain Percy, and other Olympic competitors such as Rafael Trujillo and Ian Walker.

The rest of the crew was navigator Bruno Zirilli; afterguard Andrew Simpson; traveller Gabriele Bruni; runner Anthony Nossiter; trimmers Stefano Rizzi and Christian Scherrer; grinders Michele Gnutti, Chris Brittle and Pawel Bielecki; mast Alejandro Colla; mast/pitman Massimo Galli; sewerman Piero Romeo; mid-bowman Corrado Rossignoli; Andy Fethers; and bowman Jacek Wisoski.

Team Germany
United Internet Team Germany was skippered by Jesper Bank and included America's Cup veteran David Dellenbaugh.

China Team
Pierre Mas was the skipper of China Team which had an alliance with Le Défi. Only two of the crew were Chinese.

Round robin
Round robin 2 was completed on May 9, 2007. Teams had accrued bonus points based on their results in the Louis Vuitton Acts which took place in the preceding years. For the round-robin races, two points were awarded for a win and zero for a defeat. The first four boats then progressed to the semi-finals stage of the Louis Vuitton Cup and the remainder were eliminated. As winner of the round-robin events Emirates Team New Zealand won the right to choose their opponent.

Round robin 1

The 2007 Louis Vuitton Cup started slowly with all races postponed for the first four days of competition due to light and variable winds. There were rumors that BMW Oracle was planning on rotating the crew off the boat because they were running out of stories to tell as they sat in the boat waiting for wind. To entertain fans, some teams came up with interesting stunts. For instance, United Internet Germany came up with a way to wakeboard, by having their largest sail trimmers pull on the wakeboarder using the jib trimming system.  +39, an Italian challenger, used the windless days off to continue making repairs to their mast, which shattered in a starboard-port situation with Internet Team Germany two weeks earlier, and completed mast repairs by the time racing had commenced.

The highlights for the week were not on the water, but rather off it. The Measurement Committee released the final rule interpretations. The rules state that any cup team can request an interpretation and remain anonymous. Additionally, any interpretation by the committee stays private for 6 months. Every cup team and all the media was trying to find out more about two of the final interpretations. It seems that one boat may have found a significant advantage, but everyone would have to wait until the end of the Cup to find out who and exactly what had happened.

Racing was scheduled to start on April 16, 2007, but did not get underway until April 20, 2007.

All the scheduled races for April 21, 2007, were postponed by the race committee to April 22, 2007, due to light winds.

Some of the scheduled races for April 22, 2007, and all of the races on April 23, 2007, were postponed by the race committee until April 24, 2007, due to poor wind conditions.

Some of the scheduled races for April 27, 2007, were postponed by the race committee until April 28, 2007, due to very light and variable winds.

Round robin 2 

The following week brought a little wind, and although most days the race committee postponed races for wind, they were able to race most days. Although many of the results were easy to predict, a few upsets occurred in the first round robin. In the first race of the first flight, the powerhouse from New Zealand lost to the Mascalzone Latino, an Italian challenger. In the fourth flight, Shosholoza, the underdog from South Africa, beat Luna Rossa from Italy, a three time cup veteran.

Due to the lack of wind the first week, the second round robin began without any lay days after the first. The first surprise of the second round robin was by China Team, who beat the favored BMW Oracle Racing team by 3 minutes and 15 seconds, the only team yet to achieve a win against BMW Oracle. The win was due to a delamination on the American team's headsail foil which caused the headsail to become partially detached making the sail totally ineffective for part of the race. Also, the Americans gave their best crew members a holiday and sailed against the Chinese with a less experienced crew. The following day several of the China Team members arrived at the compound with bald heads. Reportedly they bet one another that if they beat the Americans, they would shave their heads.

The final round of round robin competition featured a race for the top place. Both Emirates Team New Zealand and the United States had lost one race in the first round and zero in the second round robin. Because of Bonus Points from previous acts, New Zealand had a one-point advantage over the United States. Each race counted as two points, so a win for either team would result in the first-place finish in the round robins. The final race was expected to be an exciting match between the two. However, after the start, the race quickly became disappointing for BMW Oracle fans, with New Zealand stretching their early lead. The result was New Zealand winning the round robin, and was able to choose its opponent for the subsequent semi-final round.

Some of the scheduled races for April 29, 2007 were postponed by the race committee until April 30, 2007 due to lack of wind.

All races scheduled for May 1 were postponed to May 2 due to excessive wind.

All races scheduled for May 3 were postponed to May 4 due to thunder storms.

Knock-out stage

Semi-finals
As winner of the round-robin events Emirates Team New Zealand won the right to choose their opponent in the semi-finals and chose Desafío Español 2007. Hence BMW Oracle Racing raced against Luna Rossa Challenge in the other semi-final.  
The first team in each semi-final to win 5 races then qualified for the finals of the Louis Vuitton Cup.

Each pairing had raced against each other twice in the preceding round-robin events.

In their previous meetings, Emirates Team New Zealand had a 2–0 record against Desafío Español 2007 with winning margins of 1:12 and 0:43.  In their semi-final competition Emirates Team New Zealand always led at the 1st mark and beat Desafío Español 2007 5–2, advancing to the finals.

Likewise, BMW Oracle Racing had a 2–0 record against Luna Rossa Challenge with winning margins of 0:06 and 0:19 but were comprehensively beaten 1–5 by Luna Rosa Challenge in their semi-final.  Superior tactics by Luna Rossa Challenge in the pre-start sequences were a significant factor in their semi-final win.  Luna Rossa Challenge advanced to face Emirates Team New Zealand in the finals.

Final
The finals of the 2007 Louis Vuitton Cup pitted Luna Rossa Challenge against Emirates Team New Zealand.  Both boats had decisive results in the semi-finals, where Luna Rossa Challenge defeated BMW Oracle Racing 5–1, and Emirates Team New Zealand defeated Desafío Español 2007 5–2.

The two teams raced against each other in each of the two round robins.  Luna Rossa Challenge won their race in round robin 1 on 26 April 2007 by 48 seconds.  Emirates Team New Zealand won their race in round robin 2 on 7 May 2007 by 36 seconds.

Prior to the final, expert commentators were fairly unanimous that Emirates Team New Zealand were in top form but Luna Rossa Challenge had improved since the round robins as evidenced by their comprehensive beating of BMW Oracle Racing, one of the favourites, in their semi-final. In the best of 9 race final Emirates Team New Zealand beat Luna Rossa Challenge 5–0.  However to put this into context, Luna Rossa Challenge 'worst' defeat was in race 3 when Emirates Team New Zealand were only 0:1:38 seconds faster in a race lasting 1:35:37 i.e. a 1.71% performance advantage.  In the other 4 races the performance margin was even smaller.

Luna Rossa Challenge won the toss prior to the first race of the final which gave them the advantage of entering the starting area from the "yellow" side.

This is decided for the first race by the toss of a coin; then the advantage of starting from the yellow side alternates race by race.

References

External links

32nd America's Cup Official Website
Peter Lester NZ yachting commentator
AC 32 Challenger Commission Official website of the Challenger Commission for the 32nd America's Cup in Valencia
Team Alinghi Official website the America's Cup Defender
BMW Oracle Racing Official website of Challenger of Record of the America's Cup
BMW Oracle Racing Blog Tom Ehman's Insider Blog
CupInfo.com America's Cup News and Information for 2007
America's Cup News, articles & photos
Valencia Sailing Website with original photos and commentary on all America's Cup related activity
Cup In Europe web site Exhaustive information, photos and commentary in French.
Coupe de l'America French website about the competition.
Mariantic America's Cup News & Views
2007AC.com - America's Cup Forums
South African team website
The effect of the America's cup on the city of Valencia article at ErasmusPC
Hundreds of Louis Vuitton Cup photos
Lyn Hines Marine Marketing  America's Cup and sailing news analysis and photos

Louis Vuitton Cup
L
Sports competitions in Valencia
2007 in Spanish sport
21st century in Valencia
April 2007 sports events in Europe
May 2007 sports events in Europe
June 2007 sports events in Europe
2007 America's Cup
International America's Cup Class
Sailing competitions in Spain